The Manitoba Provincial Judges Association is an organization that represents the interests of provincial judges in Manitoba, Canada.

External links
Legislative Assembly of Manitoba: The Standing Committee on Legislative Affairs, 13 November 2003 (includes a submission by Susan Dawes, representing the Manitoba Provincial Judges Association)
Legal organizations based in Manitoba
Law-related professional associations